= Kodak Easyshare C813 =

Digital camera model

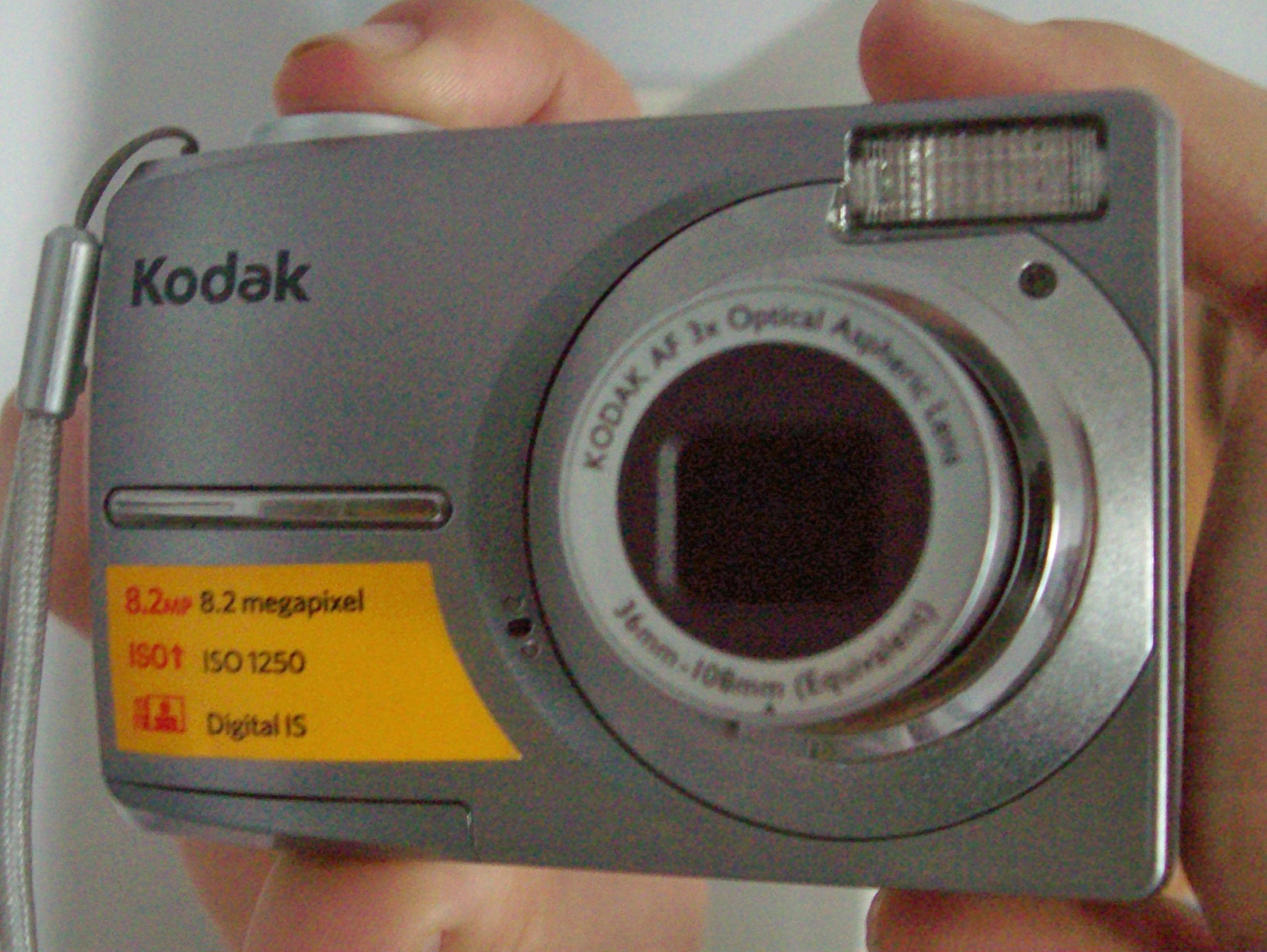
Kodak EasyShare C813

The Easyshare C813 is a discontinued digital camera made by Kodak. It features an 8.2-megapixel camera with 3× optical zoom; a 2.4-inch colour LCD; digital image stabilization; high ISO setting (up to 1250); video capture; 16 scene modes and three colour modes; on-camera picture enhancement and editing tools; 16 MB on-camera storage, expandable with an SD card. The manufacturer recommends 2 GB SDHC and claims 16 GB is the maximum. However, 32 GB 40 Mbit/s SDHC cards have been reported to be compatible.
